Vera Matović (born 3 June 1946 in Čačak) is a Serbian folk singer. Her career started in 1974 with the release of her first album, Pomiri se sudbinom; she has since released 26 albums and 13 singles. She finished Economical secondary school. During primary school, she sang with her brother's orchestra in Čačak.

Discography
 1974 – Pomiri se sudbinom -
 1975 – Sve ili ništa
 1975 – Od nemila do nedraga
 1976 – Skloni mi se s puta
 1976 – U srcu sam te zaključala
 1977 – Prekide se lanac sreće
 1977 – Lepi Marijo
 1978 – Nisi me na putu našao
 1978 – Ne mogu da se odvojim od tebe
 1979 – Nije greška već namera
 1979 – Najdraži gost
 1980 – Sačekaj me ljubavi
 1981 – Belu bluzu suza kvasi
 1981 – Zakuni se oko moje
 1982 – Hajde da se budimo u dvoje
 1983 – Javi se, javi
 1984 – Po mojoj si volji
 1985 – Ja znam lek za ostavljene
 1986 – Halo, halo, gde ideš večeras
 1987 – Samo jedan minut
 1988 – Volim te k'o Boga
 1989 – Volim te
 1990 – Kriva sam
 1991 – Živeli zaljubljeni
 1992 – Ljuljaj me sudbino
 1994 – Kakva je ovo godina
 1995 – Ti si sve što znam
 1997 – Čije su ono oči
 1998 – 18 dana
 2003 – Varaju me tvoje oči
 2006 – Ljubavni virus
 2009 – Miki Milane
 2013 - Skockala se strina
 2013 - Samo s'tobom lolo
 2015 - Zapevajmo svi siroti i bogati 
 2015 - Imam 20 eura

Filmography 
 Kamiondžije 2 (1983)
 Sok od šljiva (1981)

External links
 http://www.pulsonline.rs/licna-karta/581/vera-matovic 
 

1946 births
Living people
21st-century Serbian women singers
Yugoslav women singers
Serbian folk singers
Musicians from Čačak
BN Music artists
20th-century Serbian women singers